The Case Against Adnan Syed is a 2019 true-crime docuseries about Adnan Syed's (later vacated)  murder conviction for the killing of Hae Min Lee. It was directed by Amy J. Berg and produced by Working Title Television, among others. The first episode of the four-part series premiered March 10, 2019, on HBO.

Background
After the success of Serial Season 1, HBO green-lit a documentary series to recap the case along with new information about Syed's appeal process. HBO Documentary Films is in production on a follow-up episode to the series, featuring exclusive access to Syed leading up to and following his release from prison. 

The documentary was released in four parts and reviewed the case leading up to Syed's then-current status as of 2018. It is revealed that Syed turned down a plea bargain in 2018 that would have required him to plead guilty in exchange for reducing his sentence. Subsequently, Syed's mother told him that she had leukemia.

Reception
On the review aggregation website Rotten Tomatoes, the series holds an approval rating of 82% with an average rating of 7 out of 10, based on 33 reviews. The website's critical consensus reads, "A worthy Serial supplement that isn't without flaws, The Case Against Adnan Syed fleshes out the life of Hae Min Lee and gives context to in the complicated boon of true crime entertainment." Metacritic, which uses a weighted average, assigned the series a score of 66 out of 100 based on 16 critics, indicating "generally favorable reviews".

Critics have argued that the docuseries has a "pro-Syed bias" and is "armed with an agenda", though its creators billed it as an objective view of the case. 

Serial, the 2014 podcast that first popularized the case, also released a follow-up episode, which detailed all the reasons for Syed’s release. The podcast took the form of long-form journalism serialized over twelve weeks. At the time, it was the most downloaded podcast, at over 175 million listens. Thousands of fans engage in what “drilling”, a forensic term, as they go deeper and deeper into the evidence, the facts presented, and various inconsistencies.

Accolades
The series was nominated for a 2019 Primetime Emmy Award in Outstanding Writing for a Nonfiction Program for the episode "Forbidden Love". It was also a nominee for Outstanding Achievement in Nonfiction Series for Broadcast by Cinema Eye Honors.

References

External links 
 
 

1999 murders in the United States
January 1999 events in the United States
2010s American documentary television series
2019 American television series debuts
2019 American television series endings
True crime television series
Television shows based on podcasts
Television series by Home Box Office
Television series by Universal Television
Television series by Working Title Television